Denis Kartsev is a Russian professional ice hockey winger who currently plays for HC Sibir Novosibirsk of the Kontinental Hockey League (KHL).

Career statistics

References

External links

Living people
HC Sibir Novosibirsk players
1976 births
Russian ice hockey centres